The Salty Dog Rag is an American schottische dance described by the lyrics of the 1952 hit tune Salty Dog Rag by Red Foley. It is usually a traveling dance, often performed synchronously by multiple couples, who circumnavigate the room in a counter-clockwise direction. It can also be done in-place by a single couple. The dance is performed at some folk dance events, and it is a traditional ice-breaker at Dartmouth College.

Origins
The song recorded by Foley was composed in 1951 by John Gordy and Edward Crowe. Shortly after the 1952 release, a matching choreography was arranged and attributed to Nita and Manning Smith of College Station, Texas, who subsequently credited Leland and Frankie Lee Lawson as originating the dance.

Choreography
The adjacent figure depicts the whole dance sequence, except for the details of the a, b, and c parts, each of which represents only 8 beats of music. So in terms of actual footwork, there are only three 8-count sequences to learn. But these preferences may vary from one locale, time period, and even individual, to another. Detailed descriptions of the original notation and variations are available at several websites.

Notes

References

External links 
 Choreography, song lyrics, web links, bibliography at folkdancemusings.blogspot.com

Country dance
Folk dance
Social dance